Henrique Costa da Silva (born ) is a Brazilian-born Armenian futsal player who plays as a winger for FC Kingersheim after a short stint at Portimonense. Henrique Costa became an international for the Armenia national futsal team in 2019.

References

External links
The Final Ball profile

1995 births
Living people
Brazilian men's futsal players
Armenian men's futsal players